The Seal River is a river in northern Cochrane District in Northeastern Ontario, Canada. It is part of the James Bay drainage basin, and is a right tributary of the Kesagami River.

The river begins at an unnamed lake, flows north through Seal Lake, then continues north and reaches its mouth at the Kesagami River, just downstream of the mouth of the Little Seal River. The Kesagami River flows via the Harricana River to James Bay.

See also
List of rivers of Ontario
List of Hudson Bay rivers
List of rivers of Canada

References

Other map sources:

Rivers of Cochrane District